Devil's Angels (also known as The Checkered Flag) is a 1967 American outlaw biker film written by Charles B. Griffith and directed by Daniel Haller. It stars John Cassavetes.

Plot
Cody (John Cassavetes), and his motorcycle gang called the Skulls, hear the story of how Butch Cassidy, and his outlaw band, lived in a secret area called the Hole-in-the-Wall, where there were no police. Inspired, Cody tells the gang that they are all going to Hole-in-the-Wall to live there forever. After breaking their buddy Funky out of jail, terrorizing a store owner at a gas stop, and destroying the RV of a couple who inadvertently knocked over one of their motorcycles, they arrive in the town of Brookville as it is celebrating its annual picnic. The mayor, sheriff, and other townsfolk, immediately demand that they depart. However, the sheriff is more conciliatory and comes to an agreement with Cody that the Skulls may camp on the beach if they agree to stay there and move on in the morning.

A local girl, fascinated by the gang, joins them. Meanwhile, the mayor, and other townsfolk, have decided that the sheriff is not doing a good enough job protecting them and should force the motorcyclists out of the area. The gang gets the local girl high and begins to grope her. Frightened, she runs away. The mayor seizes on this as a pretext to falsely claim to the sheriff that she has been raped. The sheriff arrests Cody and forces the rest of them to leave. The Skulls decide to enlist the assistance of a larger motorcycle gang. Meanwhile, the sheriff realizes that he has been lied to and releases Cody. Reunited with his troop, Cody tries to convince them to continue on to Hole-in-the-Wall, but they are committed to return to Brookville to seek revenge.

The gang gathers up the girl, her family, the mayor, another prominent citizen, and the sheriff for a mock trial. The mayor and his companion are sentenced to being beaten up. The gang claims that they are owed a rape and ignore Cody as he tries to stop them. Meanwhile, the other motorcycle gang begins to terrorize the town. Cody asks one of his gang members where Hole-in-the-Wall is located. He is told there is no such place and that the whole story was a fabrication. He tries to convince his girlfriend to leave with him, but she refuses. Cody tears off his Skulls jacket, throws it into the dirt, and rides away. As he does, the police are visible converging on Brookville to restore order.

Cast
 John Cassavetes as Cody
 Beverly Adams as Lynn
 Mimsy Farmer as Marianne
 Leo Gordon as Sheriff Henderson
 Marc Cavell as Billy "The Kid"

Production
The filming begins in the vicinity of Point Fermin in San Pedro, CA.  Scenes include a pan shot of Cabrillo Beach and motorcycle runs north and southbound on Gaffey Street, just below the upper reservation of Fort MacArthur as the Skulls start off to find to Hole-in-the-Wall.
Filming took place in and around Patagonia, Arizona.

Tagline
Violence is their god... and they hunt in a pack like rabid dogs!

See also
List of American films of 1967

References

External links
 

1967 films
American International Pictures films
Outlaw biker films
1960s English-language films
Films directed by Daniel Haller
Films produced by Burt Topper
Films produced by Roger Corman
Films with screenplays by Charles B. Griffith